Helluomorphoides is a genus of beetles in the family Carabidae, containing the following species:

 Helluomorphoides agathyrsus (Buquet, 1835)
 Helluomorphoides balli Reichardt, 1974
 Helluomorphoides brunneus (Putzeys, 1846)
 Helluomorphoides clairvillei (Dejean, 1831)
 Helluomorphoides diana Reichardt, 1974
 Helluomorphoides femoratus (Dejean, 1831)
 Helluomorphoides ferrugineus (Leconte, 1853)
 Helluomorphoides gigantops Reichardt, 1974
 Helluomorphoides glabratus (Bates, 1871)
 Helluomorphoides io Reichardt, 1974
 Helluomorphoides juno Reichardt, 1974
 Helluomorphoides latitarsis (Casey, 1913)
 Helluomorphoides longicollis (Bates, 1883)
 Helluomorphoides mexicanus (Chaudoir, 1872)
 Helluomorphoides nigerrimus (Klug, 1834)
 Helluomorphoides nigripennis (Dejean, 1831)
 Helluomorphoides oculeus (Bates, 1871)
 Helluomorphoides papago (Casey, 1913)
 Helluomorphoides praeustus (Dejean, 1825)
 Helluomorphoides ritae Reichardt, 1974
 Helluomorphoides rubricollis (Schaum, 1863)
 Helluomorphoides squiresi (Chaudoir, 1872)
 Helluomorphoides texanus (Leconte, 1853)
 Helluomorphoides unicolor (Brulle, 1834)

References

Anthiinae (beetle)